Elections to Fife Council took place on 5 May 2022, the same day as the other Scottish local government elections. The election will use the 22 wards created as a result of the Local Government Commission for Scotland's 5th review which was published in September 2016, with each ward electing three or four councillors using the single transferable vote system form of proportional representation, with 75 councillors elected.

Election results

Note: "Votes" are the first preference votes. The net gain/loss and percentage changes relate to the result of the previous Scottish local elections on 4 May 2017. This may differ from other published sources showing gain/loss relative to seats held at dissolution of Scotland's councils.

|- class="unsortable" align="centre"
!rowspan=2 align="left"|Ward
! % 
!Cllrs
! %
!Cllrs
! %
!Cllrs
! %
!Cllrs
! %
!Cllrs
! %
!Cllrs
!rowspan=2|TotalCllrs
|- class="unsortable" align="center"
!colspan=2 bgcolor="" | SNP
!colspan=2 bgcolor="" | Lab
!colspan=2 bgcolor=""| Conservative
!colspan=2 bgcolor="" | Green
!colspan=2 bgcolor="" | Lib Dem
!colspan=2 bgcolor="white"| Others
|-
|align="left"|West Fife and Coastal Villages
|bgcolor="" |39.1
|bgcolor="" |1
|32.5
|1
|17.1
|1
|4.1
|0
|6.7
|0
|3.8
|0
|3
|-
|align="left"|Dunfermline North
|bgcolor="" |36.2
|bgcolor="" |1
|28.5
|1
|17.4
|1
|5.9
|0
|6.4
|0
|2.3
|0
|3
|-
|align="left"|Dunfermline Central
|bgcolor="" |33.4
|bgcolor="" |2
|24.6
|1
|9.4
|0
|6.0
|0
|24.7
|1
|1.9
|0
|4
|-
|align="left"|Dunfermline South
|bgcolor="" |33.5
|bgcolor="" |2
|23.2
|1
|10.6
|0
|3.6
|0
|19.5
|1
|2.6
|0
|4
|-
|align="left"|Rosyth
|bgcolor="" |39.4
|bgcolor="" |2
|26.3
|1
|16.8
|0
|5.2
|0
|6.5
|0
|5.9
|0
|3
|-
|align="left"|Inverkeithing and Dalgety Bay
|bgcolor="" |38.8
|bgcolor="" |2
|18.5
|1
|29.2
|1
|8.2
|0
|4.0
|0
|1.2
|0
|3
|-
|align="left"|Cowdenbeath
|36.6
|2
|bgcolor="" |38.0
|bgcolor="" |1
|28.9
|1
|2.5
|0
|1.4
|0
|2.5
|0
|4
|-
|align="left"|Lochgelly, Cardenden and Benarty
|43.2
|2
|bgcolor="" |43.6
|bgcolor="" |2
|7.7
|0
|2.3
|0
|1.8
|0
|1.5
|0
|4
|-
|align="left"|Burntisland, Kinghorn and Western Kirkcaldy
|bgcolor="" |37.9
|bgcolor="" |1
|29.4
|1
|21.0
|1
|5.7
|0
|3.5
|0
|2.6
|0
|3
|-
|align="left"|Kirkcaldy North
|38.9
|1
|bgcolor="" |39.0
|bgcolor="" |1
|15.2
|1
|3.9
|0
|colspan="2" 
|2.9
|0
|3
|-
|align="left"|Kirkcaldy Central
|37.9
|1
|bgcolor="" |41.6
|bgcolor="" |2
|13.6
|1
|4.4
|0
|2.5
|0
|colspan="2" 
|3
|-
|align="left"|Kirkcaldy East
|bgcolor="" |40.3
|bgcolor="" |2
|39.7
|1
|11.7
|0
|4.3
|0
|2.9
|0
|1.0
|0
|3
|-
|align="left"|Glenrothes West and Kinglassie 
|bgcolor="" |49.5
|bgcolor="" |2
|32.5
|1
|11.6
|0
|colspan="2" 
|3.8
|0
|2.6
|0
|3
|-
|align="left"|Glenrothes North, Leslie and Markinch
|bgcolor="" |44.6
|bgcolor="" |2
|26.4
|1
|18.6
|1
|3.6
|0
|5.1
|0
|1.7
|0
|4
|-
|align="left"|Glenrothes Central and Thornton
|bgcolor="" |48.7
|bgcolor="" |2
|27.9
|1
|12.1
|0
|3.7
|0
|3.9
|0
|3.7
|0
|3
|-
|align="left"|Howe of Fife and Tay Coast
|31.0
|1
|colspan="2" 
|14.6
|0
|7.6
|0
|bgcolor="" |44.9
|bgcolor="" |2
|1.9
|0
|3
|-
|align="left"|Tay Bridgehead
|28.4
|1
|4.3
|0
|8.4
|0
|6.3
|0
|bgcolor="" |48.2
|bgcolor="" |2
|4.4
|0
|3
|-
|align="left"|St Andrews
|22.2
|1
|8.4
|0
|14.7
|1
|6.6
|0
|bgcolor="" |48.1
|bgcolor="" |2
|colspan="2" 
|4
|-
|align="left"|East Neuk and Landward
|25.1
|1
|2.6
|0
|13.2
|0
|5.2
|0
|bgcolor="" |45.8
|bgcolor="" |2
|9.0
|0
|3
|-
|align="left"|Cupar
|25.8
|1
|3.4
|0
|11.5
|0
|4.9
|0
|bgcolor="" |52.4
|bgcolor="" |2
|2.1
|0
|3
|-
|align="left"|Leven, Kennoway and Largo
|bgcolor="" |42.4
|bgcolor="" |2
|24.7
|1
|10.4
|0
|2.4
|0
|19.3
|1
|2.1
|0
|4
|-
|align="left"|Buckhaven, Methil and Wemyss Villages
|bgcolor="" |47.4
|bgcolor="" |2
|40.8
|2
|6.5
|0
|2.2
|0
|2.3
|0
|1.3
|0
|4
|-
|}

Ward results

West Fife and Coastal Villages
2017: 1xLab; 1xCon; 1xSNP

Dunfermline North
2017: 1xCon; 1xSNP; 1xLab
2022: 1xLab; 1xSNP; 1xCon;
2017-2022 Change: No change

Dunfermline Central
2017: 2xLab; 1xCon; 1xSNP

Dunfermline South
2017: 1xCon; 1xSNP; 1xLib Dem; 1xLab

Rosyth
2017: 1xCon; 1xSNP; 1xLab

Inverkeithing and Dalgety Bay
2017: 2xSNP; 1xCon; 1xLab

Cowdenbeath
2017: 2xLab; 1xSNP; 1xCon

Lochgelly, Cardenden and Benarty
2017: 2xLab; 2xSNP

Burntisland, Kinghorn and Western Kirkcaldy
2017: 1xCon; 1xSNP; 1xLab

Kirkcaldy North
2017: 2xLab; 1xSNP

Kirkcaldy Central
2017: 2xLab; 1xSNP

Kirkcaldy East
2017: 1xLab; 1xSNP; 1xCon

Glenrothes West and Kinglassie
2017: 2xSNP; 1xLab

Glenrothes North, Leslie and Markinch
2017: 2xSNP; 1xCon; 1xLab

Glenrothes Central and Thornton
2017: 2xSNP; 1xLab

Howe of Fife and Tay Coast
2017: 1xLib Dem; 1xCon; 1xSNP
2022: 2xLib Dem; 1xSNP
2017-2022 Change: -1 Con; +1 Lib Dem

Tay Bridgehead
2017: 2xLib Dem; 1xSNP

St. Andrews
2017: 1xLib Dem; 1xCon; 1xLab; 1xSNP
2022: 2xLib Dem; 1xCon; 1xSNP
2017-2022 Change: +1 Lib Dem; -1 Lab

East Neuk and Landward
2017: 1xCon; 1xSNP; 1xLib Dem
2022: 2xLib Dem; 1xSNP
2017-2022 Change: -1 Con; +1 Lib Dem

Cupar 
2017: 1xLib Dem; 1xCon; 1xSNP
2022: 2xLib Dem; 1xSNP
2017-2022 Change: -1 Con; +1 Lib Dem

Leven, Kennoway and Largo
2017: 2xSNP; 1xCon; 1xLab

Buckhaven, Methil and Wemyss Villages
2017: 2xSNP; 2xLab

Aftermath
On 19 May 2022, a Labour-minority council was backed by 41 votes to 34, with Liberal Democrat and Conservative councillors voting for it. Labour denied forming a coalition with either the Lib Dems or the Conservatives but said they would need the support of others in the council to provide an effective administration. A social media post put out by the local authority explaining how the three Unionist parties had voted together was later edited to remove any reference to different parties. SNP group leader, Councillor David Alexander said that this outcome was "trampling on democracy" and said there was "no coherent defence for this gerrymandered motion" given that the SNP had won the most seats.

References

External links
 

Fife
2022
21st century in Fife
May 2022 events in the United Kingdom